Watnong Mountain is a mountain in Morris County, New Jersey. It is located in Parsippany-Troy Hills Township and overlooks Morris Plains to the east. It is part of the New York–New Jersey Highlands of the Reading Prong.

References 

Mountains of Morris County, New Jersey
Mountains of New Jersey